Lom is a village in the Municipality of Tržič in the Upper Carniola region of Slovenia. The local church in this village is dedicated to Saint Catherine.

Name
The name of the settlement was changed from Lom to Lom pod Storžičem in 1953.

References

External links
Lom pod Storžičem at Geopedia

Populated places in the Municipality of Tržič